Ruth Lake may refer to:

Ruth Lake (Minnesota), a lake in Crow Wing County, United States
Ruth Lake (Ontario), a lake in Nipissing Township, Canada

See also
Ruth Lake Provincial Park, British Columbia, Canada,\
Ruth Reservoir, Califoornia, United States